Vodafone España, S.A.U. is a mobile telecommunications operator in Spain headquartered in Madrid. The company was founded in 2000, as a result of the merger of the shares held by Vodafone Group and British Telecommunications plc, and Airtel Móviles, S.A.
Vodafone España offers GSM900/1800 MHz (2G), UMTS (3G), HSDPA (3.5G) and 4G LTE services in Spain.

In January 2019, Vodafone Spain reported, through a statement to the workers' representatives, the opening of a collective dismissal procedure "for economic, productive and organizational reasons" that would affect a maximum of 1,200 employees, on 23, 5% of the workforce. In May 2019, Vodafone Spain announced the launch of 5G technology in the summer in cities such as Madrid, Barcelona, Bilbao, Malaga, Seville and Valencia.

Marketing
Its motto was Es tu momento. Es Vodafone. (It's your moment. It's Vodafone.). Its formers slogand was Vodafone's previous global slogan, "Power to you". And "El Futuro Es Apasionante. Ready?". (The Future is Exciting. Ready?). Its current slogan is Vodafone's current global slogan, "Together we can".

References

External links
 Official website
 Cobertura Vodafone
 Vodafone España company profile — Hoover's

Vodafone
Companies based in the Community of Madrid
Mobile phone companies of Spain